Mealworms are the larval form of the yellow mealworm beetle, Tenebrio molitor, a species of darkling beetle. Like all holometabolic insects, they go through four life stages: egg, larva, pupa, and adult.

Reproduction 

The mealworm beetle breeds prolifically. Males insert sperm packets with their aedeagus. Within a few days the female burrows into soft ground and lays eggs. Over her lifespan, a female will, on average, lay about 500 eggs.

After 4 to 19 days the eggs hatch.

During the larval stage, the mealworms feed on vegetation and dead insects and molt between each larval stage, or instar (9 to 20 instars). After the final molt, they pupate. The new pupa is whitish and turns brown over time. After 3 to 30 days, depending on environmental conditions such as temperature, it emerges as an adult beetle.

Sex pheromones
A sex pheromone released by male mealworms has been identified. Inbreeding reduces the attractiveness of sexual pheromone signaling by male mealworms. Females are more attracted to the odors produced by outbred males than the odors produced by inbred males. The reduction of male signaling capability may be due to increased expression of homozygous deleterious recessive alleles caused by inbreeding.

Relationship with humans 
Tenebrio molitor is often used for biological research. Its relatively large size, ease of rearing and handling, and status as a non-model organism make it useful in proof of concept studies in the fields of basic biology, biochemistry, evolution, immunology and physiology.

As pests 
Mealworms have generally been considered pests, because they feed on stored grains. Mealworms probably originated in the Mediterranean region, but are now present in many areas of the world as a result of human trade and colonization. The oldest archaeological records of mealworms can be traced to Bronze Age Turkey. Records from the British Isles and northern Europe are from a later date, and mealworms are conspicuously absent from archaeological finds from ancient Egypt.

As feed and pet food

Mealworms are typically used as a pet food for captive reptiles, fish,  and birds. They are also provided to wild birds in bird feeders, particularly during the nesting season. Mealworms are useful for their high protein content. They are also used as fishing bait.

They are commercially available in bulk and are typically available in containers with bran or oatmeal for food. Commercial growers incorporate a juvenile hormone into the feeding process to keep the mealworm in the larval stage and achieve an abnormal length of 2 cm or greater.

As food 

Mealworms are edible for humans, and processed into several insect food items available in food retail such as insect burgers.

Mealworms have historically been consumed in many Asian countries, particularly in Southeast Asia. There, they are commonly found in food markets and sold as street food alongside other edible insects. Baked or fried mealworms have been marketed as a healthy snack food in recent history, though the consumption of mealworms goes back centuries.

In May 2017, mealworms were approved as food in Switzerland. In June 2021, dried mealworms were authorized as novel food in the European Union, after the European Food Safety Authority assessed the larvae as safe for human consumption.

Mealworm larvae contain significant nutrient content. For every 100 grams of raw mealworm larvae, 206 kilocalories and anywhere from 14 to 25 grams of protein are contained. Mealworm larvae contain levels of potassium, copper, sodium, selenium, iron and zinc that rival that of beef. Mealworms contain essential linoleic acids as well. They also have greater vitamin content by weight compared to beef, B12 not included.

Mealworms may be easily reared on fresh oats, wheat bran or grain, with sliced potato, carrots, or apple as a moisture source. The small amount of space required to raise mealworms has made them relevant for scalable industrialized mass production.

In waste disposal
In 2015, it was discovered that mealworms can degrade polystyrene into usable organic matter at a rate of about 34–39 milligrams per day. Additionally, no difference was found between mealworms fed only Styrofoam and the mealworms fed conventional foods, during the one-month duration of the experiment. Microorganisms inside the mealworm's gut are responsible for degrading the polystyrene, with mealworms given the antibiotic gentamicin showing no signs of degradation. Isolated colonies of the mealworm's gut microbes, however, have proven less efficient at degradation than the bacteria within the gut.

See also
 Zond 5, a 1968 space mission on which mealworms were among the first terrestrial organisms to travel to and circle the Moon
 Organisms breaking down plastic

Gallery

References

External links 

 Darkling Beetle/Mealworm Information. Center for Insect Science Education Outreach. University of Arizona.
 Mealworms and Darkling Beetles (Tenebrio beetle).  FOSSweb.
 How to Raise Mealworms
 How to Care for Mealworms

Tenebrionidae
Beetles described in 1758
Taxa named by Carl Linnaeus
Beetles and humans
Edible insects
Insects in culture
Insects as feed
Pet foods
Bird feeding
Space-flown life
Larvae
Organisms breaking down plastic
Storage pests